Ambia albomaculalis is an African moth in the family Crambidae. It was described by George Hampson in 1897. The type locality is Ghana.

References

Moths described in 1897
Musotiminae
Moths of Africa